René Hofman (born 8 March 1961) is a Dutch former footballer who played as a winger. Hofman made his professional debut at Roda JC and also played for Feyenoord Rotterdam and Fortuna Sittard. He was capped once for the Netherlands national team.

Honours
 First match: 2 March 1980 : Roda JC - Sparta Rotterdam, 2-2

References

 Profile

1961 births
Living people
Dutch footballers
Feyenoord players
Roda JC Kerkrade players
Fortuna Sittard players
Association football forwards
Netherlands international footballers
People from Heerlen
Eredivisie players